Zuheros is a mountain village located in the province of Córdoba, Spain. According to the 2006 census (INE), it has a population of 821 inhabitants. Nearby are scenic walking routes and the Murcielagos cave.

References

External links
Zuheros - Sistema de Información Multiterritorial de Andalucía
Photos of Zuheros
Information about the cave

Municipalities in the Province of Córdoba (Spain)